Tropidion enochrum is a species of beetle in the family Cerambycidae. It was described by Martins in 1968.

References

Tropidion
Beetles described in 1968